A transistor is a semiconductor device with at least three terminals for connection to an electric circuit. In the common case, the third terminal controls the flow of current between the other two terminals. This can be used for amplification, as in the case of a radio receiver, or for rapid switching, as in the case of digital circuits. The transistor replaced the vacuum-tube triode, also called a (thermionic) valve, which was much larger in size and used significantly more power to operate.The first transistor was successfully demonstrated on December 23, 1947, at Bell Laboratories in Murray Hill, New Jersey. Bell Labs was the research arm of American Telephone and Telegraph (AT&T). The three individuals credited with the invention of the transistor were William Shockley, John Bardeen and Walter Brattain. The introduction of the transistor is often considered one of the most important inventions in history.

Transistors are broadly classified into two categories: bipolar junction transistor (BJT) and field-effect transistor (FET).

The principle of a field-effect transistor was proposed by Julius Edgar Lilienfeld in 1925. John Bardeen, Walter Brattain and William Shockley invented the first working transistors at Bell Labs, the point-contact transistor in 1947. Shockley introduced the improved bipolar junction transistor in 1948, which entered production in the early 1950s and led to the first widespread use of transistors.

The MOSFET (metal–oxide–semiconductor field-effect transistor), also known as the MOS transistor, was invented by Mohamed Atalla and Dawon Kahng at Bell Labs in 1959. MOSFETs use even less power, which led to the mass-production of MOS transistors for a wide range of uses. The MOSFET has since become the most widely manufactured device in history.

Origins of transistor concept

The first patent for the field-effect transistor principle was filed in Canada by Austrian-Hungarian physicist Julius Edgar Lilienfeld on October 22, 1925, but Lilienfeld published no research articles about his devices, and his work was ignored by industry. In 1934 German physicist Dr. Oskar Heil patented another field-effect transistor. There is no direct evidence that these devices were built, but later work in the 1990s show that one of Lilienfeld's designs worked as described and gave substantial gain. Legal papers from the Bell Labs patent show that William Shockley and a co-worker at Bell Labs, Gerald Pearson, had built operational versions from Lilienfeld's patents, yet they never referenced this work in any of their later research papers or historical articles.

The Bell Lab's work on the transistor emerged from war-time efforts to produce extremely pure germanium "crystal" mixer diodes, used in radar units as a frequency mixer element in microwave radar receivers. UK researchers had produced models using a tungsten filament on a germanium disk, but these were difficult to manufacture and not particularly robust. Bell's version was a single-crystal design that was both smaller and completely solid. A parallel project on germanium diodes at Purdue University succeeded in producing the good-quality germanium semiconducting crystals that were used at Bell Labs. Early tube-based circuits did not switch fast enough for this role, leading the Bell team to use solid-state diodes instead.

After the war, Shockley decided to attempt the building of a triode-like semiconductor device. He secured funding and lab space, and went to work on the problem with Bardeen and Brattain. John Bardeen eventually developed a new branch of quantum mechanics known as surface physics to account for the "odd" behavior they saw, and Bardeen and Walter Brattain eventually succeeded in building a working device.

The key to the development of the transistor was the further understanding of the process of the electron mobility in a semiconductor. It was realized that if there was some way to control the flow of the electrons from the emitter to the collector of this newly discovered diode (discovered 1874; patented 1906), one could build an amplifier. For instance, if one placed contacts on either side of a single type of crystal, the current would not flow through it. However, if a third contact could then "inject" electrons or holes into the material, the current would flow.

Actually doing this appeared to be very difficult. If the crystal were of any reasonable size, the number of electrons (or holes) required to be injected would have to be very large, making it less useful as an amplifier because it would require a large injection current to start with. That said, the whole idea of the crystal diode was that the crystal itself could provide the electrons over a very small distance, the depletion region. The key appeared to be to place the input and output contacts very close together on the surface of the crystal on either side of this region.

Brattain started working on building such a device, and tantalizing hints of amplification continued to appear as the team worked on the problem. Sometimes the system would work, but then stop working unexpectedly. In one instance a non-working system started working when placed in water. The electrons in any one piece of the crystal would migrate about due to nearby charges. Electrons in the emitters, or the "holes" in the collectors, would cluster at the surface of the crystal, where they could find their opposite charge "floating around" in the air (or water). Yet they could be pushed away from the surface with the application of a small amount of charge from any other location on the crystal. Instead of needing a large supply of injected electrons, a very small number in the right place on the crystal would accomplish the same thing.

Their understanding solved the problem of needing a very small control area to some degree. Instead of needing two separate semiconductors connected by a common, but tiny, region, a single larger surface would serve. The emitter and collector leads would both be placed very close together on the top, with the control lead placed on the base of the crystal. When current was applied to the "base" lead, the electrons or holes would be pushed out, across the block of semiconductor, and collect on the far surface. As long as the emitter and collector were very close together, this should allow enough electrons or holes between them to allow conduction to start.

An early witness of the phenomenon was Ralph Bray, a young graduate student. He joined the germanium effort at Purdue University in November 1943 and was given the tricky task of measuring the spreading resistance at the metal–semiconductor contact. Bray found a great many anomalies, such as internal high-resistivity barriers in some samples of germanium. The most curious phenomenon was the exceptionally low resistance observed when voltage pulses were applied. This effect remained a mystery because nobody realised, until 1948, that Bray had observed minority-carrier injection the effect that was identified by William Shockley at Bell Labs and made the transistor a reality.

Bray wrote: "That was the one aspect that we missed, but even had we understood the idea of minority carrier injection... we would have said, 'Oh, this explains our effects.' We might not necessarily have gone ahead and said, 'Let's start making transistors,' open up a factory and sell them... At that time the important device was the high back voltage rectifier".

Shockley's research team initially attempted to build a field-effect transistor (FET), by trying to modulate the conductivity of a semiconductor, but was unsuccessful, mainly due to problems with the surface states, the dangling bond, and the germanium and copper compound materials. In the course of trying to understand the mysterious reasons behind their failure to build a working FET, this led them to instead inventing the bipolar point-contact and junction transistors.

First working transistor

The Bell team made many attempts to build such a system with various tools, but generally failed. Setups where the contacts were close enough were invariably as fragile as the original cat's whisker detectors had been, and would work briefly, if at all. Eventually they had a practical breakthrough. A piece of gold foil was glued to the edge of a triangular plastic wedge, and then the foil was sliced with a razor at the tip of the triangle. The result was two very closely spaced contacts of gold. When the plastic was pushed down onto the surface of a crystal and voltage applied to the other side (on the base of the crystal), current started to flow from one contact to the other as the base voltage pushed the electrons away from the base towards the other side near the contacts. The point-contact transistor had been invented.

On 15 December 1947, "When the points were very close together got voltage amp about 2 but not power amp. This voltage amplification was independent of frequency 10 to 10,000 cycles".

On 16 December 1947, "Using this double point contact, contact was made to a germanium surface that had been anodized to 90 volts, electrolyte washed off in H2O and then had some gold spots evaporated on it. The gold contacts were pressed down on the bare surface. Both gold contacts to the surface rectified nicely... The separation between points was about 4x10−3 cm. One point was used as a grid and the other point as a plate. The bias (D.C.) on the grid had to be positive to get amplification... power gain 1.3 voltage gain 15 on a plate bias of about 15 volts".

Brattain and H. R. Moore made a demonstration to several of their colleagues and managers at Bell Labs on the afternoon of 23 December 1947, often given as the birth date of the transistor. The "PNP point-contact germanium transistor" operated as a speech amplifier with a power gain of 18 in that trial. In 1956 John Bardeen, Walter Houser Brattain, and William Bradford Shockley were honored with the Nobel Prize in Physics "for their researches on semiconductors and their discovery of the transistor effect".

Twelve people are mentioned as directly involved in the invention of the transistor in the Bell Laboratory.

At the same time some European scientists were led by the idea of solid-state amplifiers. The German physicist Herbert F. Mataré (1912–2011) had conducted experiments at Telefunken with what he called "" (double diode) from 1942, when he first observed transconductance effects with silicon diodes manufactured for German radar equipment for WWII. Finally on 13 August 1948, Mataré and Heinrich Welker (1912–1981), working at Compagnie des Freins et Signaux Westinghouse in Aulnay-sous-Bois, France applied for a patent on an amplifier based on the minority carrier injection process which they called the "Transistron". The device was shown publicly on 18 May 1949. Transistrons were commercially manufactured for the French telephone company and military, and in 1953 a solid-state radio receiver with four transistrons was demonstrated at the Düsseldorf Radio Fair.

As Bell Labs did not make a public announcement of their transistor before June 1948, the transistron was an independent parallel discovery and development.

Etymology
Bell Telephone Laboratories needed a generic name for the new invention: "Semiconductor Triode", "Surface States Triode", "Crystal Triode", "Solid Triode" and "Iotatron" were all considered, but "Transistor," coined by John R. Pierce, was the clear winner of an internal ballot (owing in part to the affinity that Bell engineers had developed for the suffix "-istor"). The rationale for the name is described in the following extract from the company's Technical Memorandum calling for votes:

Pierce recalled the naming somewhat differently:

The Nobel Foundation states that the term is a combination of the words "transfer" and "resistor".

Early conflict 
Shockley was upset about the device being credited to Brattain and Bardeen, who he felt had built it "behind his back" to take the glory.  Matters became worse when Bell Labs lawyers found that some of Shockley's own writings on the transistor were close enough to those of an earlier 1925 patent by Julius Edgar Lilienfeld that they thought it best that his name be left off the patent application.

Improvements in transistor design

Switch to silicon
Germanium was difficult to purify and had a limited operational temperature range. Scientists theorized that silicon would be easier to fabricate, but few bothered to investigate this possibility. Morris Tanenbaum et al. at Bell Laboratories were the first to develop a working silicon transistor on January 26, 1954. A few months later, Gordon Teal, working independently at Texas Instruments, developed a similar device. Both of these devices were made by controlling the doping of single silicon crystals while they were grown from molten silicon. A superior method was developed by Morris Tanenbaum and Calvin S. Fuller at Bell Laboratories in early 1955 by the gaseous diffusion of donor and acceptor impurities into single crystal silicon chips.

Up until the late 1950s, however, germanium remained the dominant semiconductor material for transistors and other semiconductor devices. Germanium was initially considered the more effective semiconductor material, as it was able to demonstrate better performance due to higher carrier mobility. The relative lack of performance in early silicon semiconductors was due to electrical conductivity being limited by unstable quantum surface states, preventing electricity from reliably penetrating the surface to reach the semiconducting silicon layer.

Silicon surface passivation

In 1955, Carl Frosch and Lincoln Derick at Bell Telephone Laboratories (BTL) accidentally discovered that silicon dioxide (SiO2) could be grown on silicon. They showed that oxide layer prevented certain dopants into the silicon wafer, while allowing for others, thus discovering the passivating effect of oxidation on the semiconductor surface. In the 1950s, Mohamed Atalla, picked up Frosch's work on oxidation, investigated the surface properties of silicon semiconductors at Bell Labs, where he proposed a new method of semiconductor device fabrication, coating a silicon wafer with an insulating layer of silicon oxide so that electricity could reliably penetrate to the conducting silicon below, overcoming the surface states that prevented electricity from reaching the semiconducting layer. This is known as surface passivation, a method that became critical to the semiconductor industry as it later made possible the mass-production of silicon integrated circuits. He presented his findings in 1957. He studied the passivation of p-n junctions by oxide, and published his experimental results in 1957 BTL memos. Atalla's surface passivation method was later the basis for two inventions in 1959: the MOS transistor by Atalla and Dawon Kahng, and the planar process by Jean Hoerni.

Planar process

At a 1958 Electrochemical Society meeting, Atalla presented a paper about the surface passivation of PN junctions by oxide (based on his 1957 BTL memos), and demonstrated silicon dioxide's passivating effect on a silicon surface. Jean Hoerni attended the same meeting, and was intrigued by Atalla's presentation. Hoerni came up with a "planar idea" one morning while thinking about Atalla's device. Taking advantage of silicon dioxide's passivating effect on the silicon surface, Hoerni proposed to make transistors that were protected by a layer of silicon dioxide.

The planar process was developed by Jean Hoerni while working at Fairchild Semiconductor, with a first patent issued in 1959. The planar process used to make these transistors made mass-produced monolithic silicon integrated circuits possible.

MOSFET

In 1959, the MOSFET was introduced and in 2020 it was still the dominant transistor type in use, with  an estimated total of 13sextillion MOSFETs manufactured between 1960 and 2018. The key advantages of a MOSFET transistors over BJTs are that they consume no current except when switching states and they have faster switching speed (ideal for digital signals).

Early commercialization
The world's first commercial transistor production line was at the Western Electric plant on Union Boulevard in Allentown, Pennsylvania. Production began on Oct. 1, 1951 with the point contact germanium transistor.

The first commercial application of transistors in telecommunication was in the Fall of 1952 in tone generators for multifrequency signaling of the No. 5 Crossbar switching system in the Englewood, NJ installation, used for the first field trial of direct distance dialing (DDD).

By 1953, the transistor was being used in some products, such as hearing aids and telephone exchanges, but there were still significant issues preventing its broader application, such as sensitivity to moisture and the fragility of the wires attached to germanium crystals. Donald G. Fink, Philco's director of research, summarized the status of the transistor's commercial potential with an analogy:  "Is it a pimpled adolescent, now awkward, but promising future vigor? Or has it arrived at maturity, full of languor, surrounded by disappointments?"

Semiconductor companies initially focused on junction transistors in the early years of the semiconductor industry. However, the junction transistor was a relatively bulky device that was difficult to manufacture on a mass-production basis, which limited it to a number of specialised applications.

Transistor radios 

Prototypes of all-transistor AM radio receivers were demonstrated, but were really only laboratory curiosities. However, in 1950 Shockley developed a radically different type of solid-state amplifier which became known as the bipolar junction transistor, which works on a completely different principle than the point-contact transistor. Morgan Sparks made the bipolar junction transistor into a practical device. These were also licensed to a number of other electronics companies, including Texas Instruments, who produced a limited run of transistor radios as a sales tool. Early transistors were chemically unstable and only suitable for low-power, low-frequency applications, but as transistor design developed, these problems were slowly overcome.

There are numerous claimants to the title of the first company to produce practical transistor radios. Texas Instruments had demonstrated all-transistor AM radios as early as 1952, but their performance was well below that of equivalent battery tube models. A workable all-transistor radio was demonstrated in August 1953 at the Düsseldorf Radio Fair by the German firm Intermetall. It was built with four of Intermetall's hand-made transistors, based upon the 1948 invention of Herbert Mataré and Heinrich Welker. However, as with the early Texas units (and others) only prototypes were ever built; it was never put into commercial production.

The first transistor radio is often incorrectly attributed to Sony (originally Tokyo Tsushin Kogyo), which released the TR-55 in 1955. However, it was predated by the Regency TR-1, made by the Regency Division of I.D.E.A. (Industrial Development Engineering Associates) of Indianapolis, Indiana, which was the first practical transistor radio. The TR-1 was announced on October 18, 1954, and put on sale in November 1954 for US$49.95 (the equivalent of about US$500 in year-2020 dollars) and sold about 150,000 units.

The TR-1 used four Texas NPN transistors and had to be powered by a 22.5-volt battery, since the only way to get adequate radio frequency performance out of early transistors was to run them close to their collector-to-emitter breakdown voltage. This made the TR-1 very expensive to run, and it was far more popular for its novelty or status value than its actual performance, rather in the fashion of the first MP3 players.

Still, aside from its indifferent performance, the TR-1 was a very advanced product for its time, using printed circuit boards, and what were then considered micro-miniature components.

Masaru Ibuka, co-founder of the Japanese firm Sony, was visiting the United States when Bell Labs announced the availability of manufacturing licenses, including detailed instructions on how to manufacture junction transistors. Ibuka obtained special permission from the Japanese Ministry of Finance to pay the $50,000 license fee, and in 1955 the company introduced their own five-transistor "coatpocket" radio, the TR-55, under the new brand name Sony. This product was soon followed by more ambitious designs, but it is generally regarded as marking the commencement of Sony's growth into a manufacturing superpower.

The TR-55 was quite similar to the Regency TR-1 in many ways, being powered by the same sort of 22.5-volt battery, and was not much more practical. Note: according to the schematic, the TR-55 used a 6 volt supply. Very few were distributed outside Japan. It was not until 1957 that Sony produced their ground-breaking "TR-63" shirt pocket radio, a much more advanced design that ran on a standard 9-volt battery and could compete favorably with vacuum tube portables. The TR-63 was also the first transistor radio to use all miniature components. (The term "pocket" was a matter of some interpretation, as Sony allegedly had special shirts made with oversized pockets for their salesmen.)

In the April 28th 1955 edition of the Wall Street Journal, Chrysler and Philco announced that they had developed and produced the world's first all-transistor car radio. Chrysler made the all-transistor car radio, Mopar model 914HR, available as an "option" in Fall 1955 for its new line of 1956 Chrysler and Imperial cars, which hit the showroom floor on October 21, 1955. The all-transistor car radio was a $150 option.

The Sony TR-63, released in 1957, was the first mass-produced transistor radio, leading to the mass-market penetration of transistor radios. The TR-63 went on to sell seven million units worldwide by the mid-1960s.  With the visible success of the TR-63, Japanese competitors such as Toshiba and Sharp Corporation  joined the market. Sony's success with transistor radios led to transistors replacing vacuum tubes as the dominant electronic technology in the late 1950s.

Hobby use
The  first low-cost junction transistor available to the general public was the CK722, a PNP germanium small signal unit introduced by Raytheon in early 1953 for $7.60 each. In the 1950s and 1960s, hundreds of hobbyist electronics projects based around the CK722 transistor were published in popular books and magazines. Raytheon also participated in expanding the role of the CK722 as a hobbyist electronics device by publishing "Transistor Applications" and "Transistor Applications- Volume 2" during the mid-1950s.

Transistor computers

The world's first transistor computer was built at the University of Manchester in November 1953. The computer was built by Richard Grimsdale, then a research student in the Department of Electrical Engineering and later a Professor of Electronic Engineering at Sussex University. The machine used point-contact transistors, made in small quantities by STC and Mullard. These consisted of a single crystal of germanium with two fine wires, resembling the crystal and cat's whisker of the 1920s. These transistors had the useful property that a single transistor could possess two stable states. ... The development of the machine was severely hampered by the unreliability of the transistors. It consumed 150 watts.

Metropolitan Vickers Ltd rebuilt the full 200 transistor (& 1300 diode) design in 1956 using junction transistors (for internal use).

The IBM 7070 (1958), IBM 7090 (1959), and CDC 1604 (1960) were the first computers (as products for sale) based on transistors.

MOSFET (MOS transistor)

Building on his silicon surface passivation method, Mohamed Atalla developed the metal–oxide–semiconductor (MOS) process in the late 1950s. He proposed the MOS process could be used to build the first working silicon field-effect transistor (FET), which he began working on building with the help of Dawon Kahng at Bell Labs.

The metal–oxide–semiconductor field-effect transistor (MOSFET) was invented by Atalla and Kahng at Bell Labs. They fabricated the device in November 1959, and presented it as the "silicon-silicon dioxide field induced surface device" in early 1960. With its high scalability, and much lower power consumption and higher density than bipolar junction transistors, the MOSFET made it possible to build high-density integrated circuits (ICs), allowing the integration of more than 10,000 transistors in a single IC.

The first gallium-arsenide Schottky-gate field-effect transistor (MESFET) was made by Carver Mead and reported in 1966. The first report of a floating-gate MOSFET (FGMOS) was made by Dawon Kahng and Simon Sze in 1967.

The MOSFET has since become the most widely manufactured device in history.  As of 2018, an estimated total of 13sextillion MOS transistors have been manufactured.

PMOS and NMOS
There were originally two types of MOSFET logic, PMOS (p-type MOS) and NMOS (n-type MOS). Both types were developed by Atalla and Kahng when they originally invented the MOSFET, fabricating both PMOS and NMOS devices with a 20µm process.

CMOS

A new type of MOSFET logic, CMOS (complementary MOS), was invented by Chih-Tang Sah and Frank Wanlass at Fairchild Semiconductor, and in February 1963 they published the invention in a research paper.

Self-aligned gate
The self-aligned gate (silicon-gate) MOSFET transistor was invented by Robert Kerwin, Donald Klein and John Sarace at Bell Labs in 1967. Fairchild Semiconductor researchers Federico Faggin and Tom Klein later used self-aligned gate MOSFETs to develop the first silicon-gate MOS integrated circuit.

MOSFET commercialization

The MOSFET, also known as the MOS transistor, was the first truly compact transistor that could be miniaturised and mass-produced for a wide range of uses. It revolutionized the wider electronics industry, including power electronics, consumer electronics, control systems, and computers. The MOSFET has since become the most common type of transistor in the world, with uses including computers, electronics, and communications technology (such as smartphones). The MOS transistor has been described as the "workhorse of the electronics industry" due to being the building block of every microprocessor, memory chip and telecommunication circuit in use. Billions of MOS transistors are manufactured every day, as of 2013.

Integrated circuits
General Microelectronics introduced the first commercial MOS integrated circuits in 1964, consisting of 120 p-channel transistors. It was a 20-bit shift register, developed by Robert Norman and Frank Wanlass. In 1967, Bell Labs researchers Robert Kerwin, Donald Klein and John Sarace developed the self-aligned gate (silicon-gate) MOS transistor, which Fairchild Semiconductor researchers Federico Faggin and Tom Klein used to develop the first silicon-gate MOS IC.

By 1972, MOS LSI (large-scale integration) circuits were commercialized for numerous applications, including automobiles, trucks, home appliances, business machines, electronic musical instruments, computer peripherals, cash registers, calculators, data transmission and telecommunication equipment.

Semiconductor memory

The first modern memory cells were introduced in 1965, when John Schmidt designed the first 64-bit MOS SRAM (static RAM). In 1967, Robert H. Dennard of IBM filed a patent for a single-transistor DRAM (dynamic RAM) memory cell, using a MOSFET.

The earliest practical application of floating-gate MOSFET (FGMOS) was floating-gate memory cells, which Dawon Kahng and Simon Sze proposed could be used to produce reprogrammable ROM (read-only memory). Floating-gate memory cells later became the basis for non-volatile memory (NVM) technologies including EPROM (erasable programmable ROM), EEPROM (electrically erasable programmable ROM) and flash memory.

Microprocessors
The MOSFET is the basis of every microprocessor. The earliest microprocessors were all MOS microprocessors, built with MOS LSI circuits. The first multi-chip microprocessors, the Four-Phase Systems AL1 in 1969 and the Garrett AiResearch MP944 in 1970, were developed with multiple MOS LSI chips. The first commercial single-chip microprocessor, the Intel 4004, was developed by Federico Faggin, using his silicon-gate MOS IC technology, with Intel engineers Marcian Hoff and Stan Mazor, and Busicom engineer Masatoshi Shima. With the arrival of CMOS microprocessors in 1975, the term "MOS microprocessors" began to refer to chips fabricated entirely from PMOS logic or fabricated entirely from NMOS logic, contrasted with "CMOS microprocessors" and "bipolar bit-slice processors".

Pocket calculators
One of the earliest influential consumer electronic products enabled by MOS transistors was the electronic pocket calculator. In 1965, the Victor 3900 desktop calculator was the first MOS LSI calculator, with 29 MOS LSI chips. In 1967 the Texas Instruments Cal-Tech was the first prototype electronic handheld calculator, with three MOS LSI chips, and it was later released as the Canon Pocketronic in 1970. The Sharp QT-8D desktop calculator was the first mass-produced LSI MOS calculator in 1969, and the Sharp EL-8 which used four MOS LSI chips was the first commercial electronic handheld calculator in 1970. The first true electronic pocket calculator was the Busicom LE-120A HANDY LE, which used a single MOS LSI calculator-on-a-chip from Mostek, and was released in 1971.

Personal computers
In the 1970s, the MOS microprocessor was the basis for home computers, microcomputers (micros) and personal computers (PCs). This led to the start of what is known as the personal computer revolution or microcomputer revolution.

Power electronics
The power MOSFET is the most widely used power device in the world. Advantages over bipolar junction transistors in power electronics include MOSFETs not requiring a continuous flow of drive current to remain in the ON state, offering higher switching speeds, lower switching power losses, lower on-resistances, and reduced susceptibility to thermal runaway. The power MOSFET had an impact on power supplies, enabling higher operating frequencies, size and weight reduction, and increased volume production.

The power MOSFET, which is commonly used in power electronics, was developed in the early 1970s. The power MOSFET enables low gate drive power, fast switching speed, and advanced paralleling capability.

Patents

References

Books and literature
  A history of Bell Laboratories and its technological innovations
  The invention of the transistor & the birth of the information age
 
 Out of the Crystal Maze Chapters from The History of Solid State Physics (728s)
 Electronic Genie: THE TANGLED HISTORY OF SILICON (304s)
 The INVENTION THAT CHANGED THE WORLD: HOW A SMALL GROUP OF RADAR PIONEERS WON THE SECOND WORLD WAR AND LAUNCHED A TECH (576s)

External links

 The Bell Systems Memorial on Transistors.
 IEEE Global History Network, The Transistor and Portable Electronics. All about the history of transistors and integrated circuits.
 Transistorized''. Historical and technical information from the Public Broadcasting Service
 This Month in Physics History: November 17 to December 23, 1947: Invention of the First Transistor. From the American Physical Society
 50 Years of the Transistor. From Science Friday, December 12, 1997
 Jack Ganssle "The transistor: 60 years old and still switching". EEtimes article, November 28, 2007
 John Markoff "Parallel Inventor of the Transistor Has His Moment." New York Times, 24 February 2003
 Michael Riordan "How Europe Missed The Transistor". IEEE Spectrum, Vol. 42, Issue 11 S. 52 - 57 November 2005
 Armand Van Dormael " The 'French' Transistor". 
 Mark P D Burgess (2008) "Semiconductor History: Faraday to Shockley"

Transistors
Transistor
Transistor